The 1996 Indonesian motorcycle Grand Prix was the second round of the 1996 Grand Prix motorcycle racing season. It took place on 7 April 1996 at the Sentul International Circuit.

500 cc classification

250 cc classification

125 cc classification

References

Indonesian motorcycle Grand Prix
Indonesia
Motorcycle Grand Prix